Tharrhias is an extinct genus of prehistoric bony fish that lived during the Aptian stage of the Early Cretaceous epoch. The type species T. araripis is named after the Araripe Basin, in which it was found in sediments of the Santana Formation.

Crab prezoea larvae have been found fossilised in the stomach contents of Tharrhias.

See also 

 Prehistoric fish
 List of prehistoric bony fish

References 

Early Cretaceous fish
Aptian life
Prehistoric fish of South America
Early Cretaceous animals of South America
Cretaceous Brazil
Fossils of Brazil
Romualdo Formation
Fossil taxa described in 1908